Biffarius filholi is a ghost shrimp of the family Callianassidae, endemic to New Zealand, which grows up to  long.

References

Marine crustaceans of New Zealand
Thalassinidea
Crustaceans described in 1878